Data Display Debugger (GNU DDD) is a graphical user interface (using the Motif toolkit) for command-line debuggers such as GDB, DBX, JDB, HP Wildebeest Debugger, XDB, the Perl debugger, the Bash debugger, the Python debugger, and the GNU Make debugger. DDD is part of the GNU Project and distributed as free software under the GNU General Public License.

Technical details 
DDD has GUI front-end features such as viewing source texts and its interactive graphical data display, where data structures are displayed as graphs.

DDD is used primarily on Unix systems, and its usefulness is complemented by many open source plug-ins available for it.

Notes & references

References

Notes

See also 

 Debugger front-end
 KDbg, a KDE debugger front-end
 ups (debugger)

External links
Source code

Debuggers
GNU Project software
Unix programming tools
Software that uses Motif (software)